Curetis insularis is a species of butterfly belonging to the lycaenid family. It is found in the  Indomalayan realm (Java, Peninsular Malaya, Borneo, Sumatra, Thailand). Curetis insularis was described by Horsfield in 1829.

References

External links

"Curetis Hübner, [1819]" at Markku Savela's Lepidoptera and Some Other Life Forms. Retrieved June 6, 2017.

insularis
Butterflies described in 1829